Thomas Alan Bock (born April 11, 1945) is an American politician in the state of Vermont. He is a member of the Vermont House of Representatives, sitting as a Democrat from the Windsor-3-1 district, having been first elected in 2016.

References

1945 births
Living people
People from Sauk Rapids, Minnesota
People from Chester, Vermont
St. Cloud State University alumni
21st-century American politicians
Democratic Party members of the Vermont House of Representatives